This is a list of Members of Parliament (MPs) elected in the 1918 general election. This Parliament was elected on 14 December 1918, assembled on 4 February 1919 and was dissolved on 26 October 1922.

The normal polling day did not apply to the university constituencies (polls open for five days) and Orkney and Shetland (poll open two days). Votes in the territorial constituencies were not counted until 28 December 1918 to allow time for postal votes from members of the armed forces to arrive.

Coalition and Non-Coalition: In most constituencies in Great Britain one supporter of the coalition government, led by David Lloyd George (the Liberal Prime Minister) and Bonar Law (the Conservative leader), was issued the so-called coupon. Candidates elected as Liberals or Conservatives, without the coupon, were not necessarily hostile to the government. This list follows the label used in F.W.S. Craig's book cited below. No attempt is made to indicate changes between the Coalition and Non-Coalition wings of a party. Few coupons were issued to Irish candidates, so none are designated as Coalition MPs.

Conservative and Unionist MPs: Conservative, Irish Unionist, Labour Unionist and Ulster Unionist MPs constituted a single party in Parliament. Candidates of the Ulster Unionist Council are classified as Irish Unionists until May 1921 and Ulster Unionists thereafter. The only Unionists, in this Parliament, not to be from Ulster constituencies represented Dublin Rathmines and Dublin University.

The Parliament of 1918–22 had a poor reputation with contemporaries: John Maynard Keynes' "The Economic Consequences of the Peace" includes a famous remark about the Conservative MPs that "They are a lot of hard-faced men, who look as if they had done very well out of the war" which Keynes attributed to a Conservative friend. Keynes privately confirmed that the friend who originated the remark was Stanley Baldwin.

By-elections 
See the list of United Kingdom by-elections.

Seats vacant on dissolution
Eight seats were vacant when Parliament was dissolved preparatory to the 1922 general election:

Tipperary East--Pierce McCan (Sinn Féin) died 6 March 1919
Cork Mid--Terence MacSwiney (Sinn Féin) died 25 October 1920
Dublin North--Frank Lawless (Sinn Féin) died 16 April 1922
Longford--Joseph McGuinness (Sinn Féin) died 31 May 1922
County Waterford--Cathal Brugha (Sinn Féin) died 7 July 1922
Roscommon South--Harry Boland (Sinn Féin) died 2 August 1922
Cavan East--Arthur Griffith (Sinn Féin) died 12 August 1922
Cork South--Michael Collins (Sinn Féin) died 22 August 1922

These 5 seats, formed part of the Southern Ireland state, envisaged by the Government of Ireland Act 1920, and were to be part of the forthcoming Irish Free State, as envisaged by the Anglo-Irish Treaty of 1921, and thus were not part of the House of Commons 1922 election.

Tyrone North-West--Arthur Griffith (Sinn Féin) died 12 August 1922 – seat replaced by Fermanagh and Tyrone for the House of Commons 1922 election.

Changes

1921 
May: Unionist MPs in Northern Ireland are classified in this article as Ulster Unionists instead of Irish Unionists, due to the implementation of the Government of Ireland Act 1920 and the partition of Ireland.

References

1918
1918 United Kingdom general election
 List
UK MPs